The 1999 Oaxaca earthquake occurred on September 30 at 11:31 local time (16:31 UTC) in Oaxaca, Mexico, 60 km NNW of Puerto Ángel. The epicenter was located near San Agustin Loxicha. It had a magnitude of  7.4. The maximum intensity reached MM VIII in southwestern Oaxaca, and could be felt strongly in Mexico City. The torrential rains preceding and following the temblor intensified the damage of this earthquake. Thirty-five people were reported dead. The archeological site of the ancient Zapotec city of Monte Alban also suffered damage in this earthquake. This was an intraplate earthquake in the Cocos Plate, with a normal-faulting mechanism. The fault plane was 90 km long and 45 km wide. The maximum slip was about 2.5 m, which was located about 20 and 40 km WNW of the hypocenter.

See also
 List of earthquakes in 1999
 List of earthquakes in Mexico
 1999 Tehuacán earthquake

References

External links

Oaxaca Earthquake, 1999
1999 Oaxaca
Oaxaca, 1999
20th century in Mexico
History of Oaxaca
Geography of Oaxaca
1999 disasters in Mexico